William Armstrong (1795–1847) was an American Jeffersonian Republican politician. He served as the Mayor of Nashville, Tennessee from 1829 to 1833.

Early life
Armstrong was born in 1795. His father was Col. James Armstrong and his mother, Susan (Wells) Armstrong.

Career
Armstrong fought in the Battle of New Orleans of January 8, 1815 in the War of 1812. He served as Mayor of Nashville from 1829 to 1833. In 1835, President Andrew Jackson appointed him Superintendent of Indian Affairs in the Western Territory, where he implemented the Cherokee removal from Georgia, South Carolina, North Carolina, Tennessee, Texas, and Alabama to the Indian Territory (now known as Oklahoma). His brother, Major Francis Wells Armstrong, served in a similar capacity.

Personal life
Armstrong married Nancy Irwin on July 1, 1823. They had three sons, James Trooper, David Irwin and Francis Armstrong, and four daughters, Mary Elizabeth, Margaret, Susan Wells, and Nancy Irwin. He died on June 12, 1847 at his plantation in the Choctaw Nation and was buried in Fort Coffee, Oklahoma.

References

1795 births
1847 deaths
Tennessee Democratic-Republicans
Mayors of Nashville, Tennessee
American planters
19th-century American politicians